Queen of the Lot is a 2010 American comedy-drama film written and directed by Henry Jaglom and starring Tanna Frederick and Noah Wyle.  It is the sequel to Jaglom's 2006 film Hollywood Dreams.

Cast
Tanna Frederick
Noah Wyle
Christopher Rydell
Peter Bogdanovich
Dennis Christopher
Zack Norman
Paul Sand
David Proval
Kathryn Crosby
Mary Crosby
Jack Heller
Ron Vignone
Diane Salinger
Sabrina Jaglom

Release
The film was released in theaters in Southern California on November 19, 2010.

Reception
The film has a 36% rating on Rotten Tomatoes.  Andrew Schenker of Slant Magazine awarded the film one and a half stars out of four.  Colin Covert of the Star Tribune awarded it two stars out of four.  Wesley Morris of The Boston Globe gave the film two and a half stars out of four.

Andrew Barker of Variety gave the film a negative review and wrote that "this meandering, talky film-industry satire never manages to rouse itself from a near-comatose level of self-satisfaction."

Kirk Honeycutt of The Hollywood Reporter also gave the film a negative review and wrote, "Henry Jaglom again tries to mix comedy with melodrama with decidedly mixed results."

The New York Times gave the film a positive review and wrote, "Juggling love story, jewel heist, suicide and a hilarious 12-step meeting, Jaglom displays his usual loosey-goosey style and insider wit."

References

External links
 
 

American comedy-drama films
Films directed by Henry Jaglom
American sequel films
2010 comedy-drama films
2010 films
2010s English-language films
2010s American films